John Christian may refer to:

John Christian (Deemster) (1776–1852), First Deemster of the Isle of Man
  John Christian (MP) for Colchester (UK Parliament constituency) (1391–1395)
John Christian of Brieg, Duke of Brzeg–Legnica–Wołów (1591–1639)
John Christian, Count Palatine of Sulzbach (1700–1733)
John T. Christian (1854–1925), Baptist preacher, author and educator
John Wyrill Christian (1926–2001), British metallurgist
John Lorenzo Christian (1895–1984), Chief Magistrate of Pitcairn Island
John Christian (musician) (born 1981), Dutch musician